Vesper Peak is a peak along the Mountain Loop Highway region of the North Cascades of Washington state. Its gentle south and east slopes contrast with a sheer north face which offers "excellent technical routes".

Geology
The peak is primarily composed of intrusive quartz diorite, but the south and southwest slopes are metavolcanic rock. Grossular garnet occurs in skarn zones on the peak, which have been mined for 
this mineral.

Climbing and recreation
The peak was ascended in 1918 during a Mountaineers outing, but "they were likely preceded by prospectors and a geological survey party led by Louis C. Fletcher". The steep north face was first climbed in 1968 by Bruce Garrett and Jim Langdon; several routes exist on the face, with difficulties in the 5.6 to 5.10 range.

The summit can be reached from the Sunrise Mine Road (No. 4065), off the Mountain Loop Highway. The summit affords views of Glacier Peak, Sloan Peak, Mount Dickerman, Mount Pugh, Mount Rainier, Mount Stuart and a bit of the top of Mount Adams.

In popular culture
This Location is the first scene the player sees, and an optional destination in the "Postcards" section in the VR Demo The Lab.

References

External links
 
 
 
 

Mountains of Washington (state)
Mountains of Snohomish County, Washington